Maoricicada campbelli, also known as the Campbell's cicada, is a species of cicada that is endemic to New Zealand. This species was first described by John Golding Myers in 1923 under the name Melapsalta campbelli. It was named in honour of James Wishart Campbell, who collected the first specimens of this species.

References

Cicadas of New Zealand
Insects described in 1923
Endemic fauna of New Zealand
Cicadettini
Endemic insects of New Zealand